The Christmas Album is the tenth studio album and first Christmas album by Australian pop vocal group Human Nature, released in November 2013.

The album was re-released with four additional tracks in November 2015.

Background
The album was recorded in Los Angeles and Las Vegas and features cover version of successful Christmas songs such as "White Christmas", "Winter Wonderland" and a medley consisting of "Silent Night" mixed with "O Holy Night". The Christmas Album includes two duets; one with Australian singer Jessica Mauboy and the other with Smokey Robinson. The album was supported by a national tour in December 2013, accompanied by a 16-piece band.

Music videos 
Human Nature released 6 music videos via their Vevo account throughout November and December 2013. 
"Let It Snow, Let It Snow, Let It Snow" featuring Delta Goodrem was released in November 2015, to support the deluxe edition of the album.

Critical reception
Andrew Le of Renowned for Sound gave the album 3.5 out of 5 stars, saying that the tone is generally upbeat and  "soulful vocals with retro touches and rich, heavenly harmonies are what Human Nature do best".

Track listing

Tour

Human Nature announced a 10-day Australian tour to promote the album, commencing in Melbourne on 5 December 2013.

Charts
The album debuted on the Australian ARIA charts at number 12 and climbed three spots to 9 the following week and was certified Platinum. In the third week, it climbed another three spots to number 6. It peaked at number 4 in its fifth week.

Weekly charts

Year-end charts

Decade-end charts

Sales and certifications

See also
 List of top 25 albums for 2013 in Australia

References

Human Nature (band) albums
2013 Christmas albums
Albums produced by the Underdogs (production team)
Christmas albums by Australian artists
Pop Christmas albums
Sony Music Christmas albums